Jim Hockaday (born March 7, 1964) is a former American football player who played one season with the New England Steamrollers of the Arena Football League. He played college football at the University of Georgia.

References

External links
Just Sports Stats

Living people
1964 births
Players of American football from Tennessee
American football wide receivers
American football linebackers
Georgia Bulldogs football players
New England Steamrollers players
People from Brentwood, Tennessee